Pablo José Maqueda Andrés (born 18 January 1971) is a Spanish former footballer who played as a forward.

Club career
Born in Barcelona, Catalonia, Maqueda started his professional career with FC Barcelona, but only played three La Liga games with the club over two seasons, also spending two years with the reserves in Segunda División. In the summer of 1993 he joined fellow top-flight side Real Oviedo, being used almost exclusively as a substitute in his first two years.

After a season-long loan at RCD Mallorca in the second tier, being an essential attacking unit as the team reached the promotion playoffs, eventually losing against Rayo Vallecano, Maqueda returned to Oviedo and experienced his best campaign in the top division, scoring seven goals in 31 matches as the Asturians barely avoided relegation (17th). Subsequently, he moved abroad and signed with Avispa Fukuoka in the J1 League.

After one year in Japan, Maqueda returned to his country and his native region, joining division two club UE Lleida and retiring from professional football aged only 29. In early 2005 he returned to active with amateurs CD Binissalem in Majorca, and remained with them until the end of 2006–07.

References

External links

1971 births
Living people
Footballers from Barcelona
Spanish footballers
Association football forwards
La Liga players
Segunda División players
Tercera División players
FC Barcelona Atlètic players
FC Barcelona players
Real Oviedo players
RCD Mallorca players
UE Lleida players
CD Binissalem players
J1 League players
Avispa Fukuoka players
Spanish expatriate footballers
Expatriate footballers in Japan
Spanish expatriate sportspeople in Japan